Lawrence Cunliffe (born 25 March 1929) is a retired British Labour Party politician. He was the Member of Parliament (MP) for Leigh from 1979 to 2001.

Early life
Cunliffe was born in Walkden, Lancashire, in 1929. He was a National Coal Board engineer, and became involved in the National Union of Mineworkers.

Parliamentary career
He first stood for Parliament in Rochdale. There, he lost the previously Labour-held seat to the Liberal candidate Cyril Smith at a by-election in 1972, and was again defeated by Smith at the subsequent general election in February 1974.

Cunliffe served as the Member of Parliament for Leigh from 1979 until he retired from the House of Commons at the 2001 general election.

References

External links
 

1929 births
Living people
Labour Party (UK) MPs for English constituencies
National Union of Mineworkers-sponsored MPs
UK MPs 1979–1983
UK MPs 1983–1987
UK MPs 1987–1992
UK MPs 1992–1997
UK MPs 1997–2001
People from Walkden
Members of the Parliament of the United Kingdom for Leigh